The 2021–22 season was the 119th season in the existence of K.A.A. Gent and the club's 33rd consecutive season in the top flight of Belgian football. In addition to the domestic league, Gent participated in this season's editions of the Belgian Cup and the UEFA Europa Conference League.

Players

First-team squad

Other players under contract

Out on loan

Transfers

Pre-season and friendlies

Competitions

Overall record

First Division A

League table

Results summary

Results by round

Matches
The league fixtures were announced on 8 June 2021.

Play-Off II

Results summary

Results by round

Matches

Belgian Cup

UEFA Europa Conference League

Second qualifying round
The draw for the second qualifying round was held on 16 June 2021.

Third qualifying round
The draw for the third qualifying round was held on 19 July 2021.

Play-off round
The draw for the play-off round was held on 2 August 2021.

Group stage

The draw for the group stage was held on 27 August 2021.

Knockout phase

Round of 16
The draw for the round of 16 was held on 25 February 2022.

Statistics

Squad appearances and goals
Last updated on 10 April 2022

|-
! colspan=14 style=background:#dcdcdc; text-align:center|Goalkeepers

|-
! colspan=14 style=background:#dcdcdc; text-align:center|Defenders

|-
! colspan=14 style=background:#dcdcdc; text-align:center|Midfielders

|-
! colspan=14 style=background:#dcdcdc; text-align:center|Forwards

|-
! colspan=14 style=background:#dcdcdc; text-align:center|Players who have made an appearance this season but have left the club

|}

Goalscorers

References

K.A.A. Gent seasons
Gent
2021–22 UEFA Europa Conference League participants seasons